The Bishopville Railroad was a shortline railroad that served central South Carolina in the late 19th century.

The Bishopville Railroad Company was chartered by the South Carolina General Assembly in 1882.

The 19-mile line was opened around 1892 and its name changed to the South and North Carolina Railroad.

The line was sold to the Manchester and Augusta Railroad Company on January 1, 1896, and became part of the Atlantic Coast Line Railroad in 1898.

References

Defunct South Carolina railroads
Railway companies established in 1882
Railway companies disestablished in 1892